Porina mariae is a species of saxicolous (rock-dwelling) crustose lichen in the family Trichotheliaceae. Found on Lord Howe Island, Australia, it was formally described as a new species in 1997 by lichenologist Patrick M. McCarthy. The type specimen was collected by the author on the track from Smoking Tree Ridge to Boat Harbour, where it was growing on deeply shaded basalt. The species epithet honours the author's wife, Marie Meaney-McCarthy, "in recognition of her unwavering encouragement and support".

Description

The lichen has a pale grey-green, matt to slightly glossy thallus, lacking both a cortex and a prothallus. The photobiont partner is a green alga from the genus Trentepohlia, with cells that measure 8–20 by 7–16 μm. Characters that distinguish it from other members of genus Porina include the thickness of its  (80–200 μm), and the dimensions of its  (0.48–0.97 mm in diameter, convex to hemispherical in shape and lacking attenuation at the base).

References

Gyalectales
Lichen species
Lichens described in 1997
Lichens of Australasia